Lambs of God is a 2019 Australian television gothic drama series on Foxtel's Showcase. The series was adapted from Marele Day's 1997 novel of the same name about three eccentric nuns living on a secluded and remote island. They have been forgotten by time and the Catholic Church and are forced to defend their lives and beliefs when a priest, Father Ignatius, unwittingly finds them.

Plot
Three Catholic nuns, Sisters Iphigenia, Margarita and Carla, are the last remaining members of the enclosed order of St Agnes living on a remote island with a flock of sheep which they believe are the reincarnations of their departed sisters. A young priest, Father Ignatius, arrives to survey the supposedly abandoned abbey for the church, but he is injured and becomes their prisoner. His presence stirs very different emotions in each of the nuns which come to a climax when another envoy from the church, Father Bob, is sent to investigate and dies after falling into a trap. While Iphigenia travels to the mainland to claim her inheritance to save the abbey, Margarita accidentally creates a miracle and heals Ignatius' foot. The abbey then becomes a commercial success as an attraction for pilgrims.

Production
Filming commenced in May 2018 at Fox Studios and on location in the Blue Mountains, the New South Wales south coast and Tasmania. The series is written by Sarah Lambert, directed by Jeffrey Walker and Don McAlpine is director of photography.

Cast and characters 
 Essie Davis as Sister Iphigenia
 Ann Dowd as Sister Margarita
 Jessica Barden as Sister Carla
 Sam Reid as Father Ignatius
 Kate Mulvany as Frankie 
 Daniel Henshall as Barnaby
 Ezekiel Simat as Jeremiah
 Damon Herriman as Father Bob

Episodes

References

External links
 
 

2019 Australian television series debuts
2010s Australian drama television series
English-language television shows
Showcase (Australian TV channel) original programming
Television shows based on Australian novels